Changwen may refer to:

 Changwon (Yale: Changwen), Gyeongsangnam-do, South Korea
 Chen Qun (died 237; courtesy name: Changwen), Three Kingdoms Era politician of Cao Wei
 Cheng Changwen, Tang Dynasty poet
 Chen Changwen (born 1944), Chinese politician
 Liú Chàngwén, Miss China International 2008, see China at major beauty pageants
 Miao Changwen (缪昌文), a male Han Chinese politician for Jiangsu at the 11th National People's Congress; see List of members of the 11th National People's Congress

See also

 Wenchang (disambiguation)
 Chang (disambiguation)
 Wen (disambiguation)